The Otay Mountain Wilderness is a U.S. Wilderness Area located in San Diego County, California, 12 miles east of the city of Otay Mesa and just north of the Mexican border.

Wilderness status was conferred on October 7, 1998, effectively preserving 18,500 acres under protection of the Wilderness Act, a component of the National Wilderness Preservation System. The legislation was signed by President Bill Clinton on December 11, 1999.

Geography 
The mountain, and its immediate surroundings, are extremely rugged and include steep, often precipitous, canyon walls and hills.

The public lands within the Otay Mountain Wilderness are one of the last remaining pristine locations in western San Diego County. Adjacent to the Mexican border, it is internationally known for its diversity of unique and sensitive plants. The area plays a critical role in San Diego's multi-species conservation plan.

Natural history 

The San Ysidro Mountains are remnants of a chain of ancient volcanoes from which meta-volcanic soils form, sustaining a diverse chaparral community dominated by chamise (Adenostoma fasciculatum), mixed chaparral and coastal sagebrush habitats.

Flora 
The world's largest stand of Tecate cypress (Cupressus forbesii) are found at Otay Mountain Wilderness, as are at least 15 plant species that are candidates for federal listing as threatened or endangered species. In all 37 plant species found on Otay Mountain are listed as sensitive by the California Native Plant Society, at least five, including the Tecate cypress, occur only on Otay Mountain or in the immediate are.

Particularly important species include: 
 Cleveland's monkeyflower (Mimulus clevelandii)
 Mexican flannelbush (Fremontodendron mexicanum)
 Otay Mountain lotus (Lotus crassifolius var. otayensis)
 Southern mountain misery (Chamaebatia australis)
 San Miguel savory (Clinopodium chandleri)
 Gander's pitcher sage (Lepechinia ganderi)

Endangered species 
 San Diego thorn-mint (Acanthomintha ilicifolia)
 Parish's button-celery (Eryngium aristulatum var. parishii)
 Otay tarweed (Hemizonia conjugens)
 Dehesa bear-grass (Nolina interrata)

Rare species 
 Dunn's mariposa (Calochortus dunnii)
 Slender-pod squaw cabbage (Caulanthus stenocarpus)
 Mexican fremontia (Fremontodendron mexicanum)
 Gander butterweed (Senecio ganderi)

Fauna 

The diversity of habitats within the wilderness area maintains a variety of indigenous fauna, including a number of rare or endangered species. The most numerous large animal is the mule deer.

Species of special concern on Otay Mountain include: 
 California gnatcatcher
 Orange-throated whiptail
 Coast horned lizard

Endangered species 
 Bighorn sheep
 Quino checkerspot butterfly 
 The arroyo toad, resident of the Tijuana river, is affected by erosion occurring on the Tijuana watershed, within the wilderness area, which causes silting of its habitat.

Protected species 
 Mountain lion
 Southern bald eagle

Border wall 
In the mid 1990s, as part of Operation Gatekeeper, Department of Homeland Security contractors began to build a border wall, and associated access roads. The initial phase of wall building extended from San Diego only as far as the foothills of Otay Mountain.
 
An environmental impact statement carried out prior to a waiver of an environmental law, required to allow construction within the wilderness area, concluded that the work on the border wall would have long-term impacts on plant, animal and water courses within the area. Grading and construction of roads in the wilderness area would result in removal of layers of topsoil and delicate, intertwined root systems that protect dry chaparral habitat from erosion. The wall itself disrupts the ability of migratory animals, like the javelina, to roam freely across its natural range. In December 2008 work began to continue the wall's progress through the wilderness area, under the auspices of the Secure Fence Act of 2006.

See also 
 List of U.S. Wilderness Areas
 Mexico–United States barrier
 National Landscape Conservation System
 Wilderness Act

Notes 
IUCN category obtained from Protected Planet: Otay Mountain State Ecological Reserve entry. Retrieved March 7, 2015.

References 

Wilderness areas of California
Protected areas of San Diego County, California
San Ysidro Mountains
South Bay (San Diego County)
Bureau of Land Management areas in California
Protected areas established in 1999
1999 establishments in California